Satyanarayan Gangaram Pitroda also known as Sam Pitroda is an Indian inventor, telecommunication engineer and entrepreneur. He was born in Titlagarh in the eastern Indian state of Odisha to a Gujarati family. He was also an advisor to the PM during Dr. Manmohan Singh's tenure.

Early life 
Pitroda was born in Titlagarh, Odisha, India to Gujarati parents. He had seven siblings and is third oldest among them. The family was deeply influenced by Mahatma Gandhi and his philosophy. Consequently, Pitroda and his brother were sent to Gujarat to imbibe Gandhian philosophy. He completed his schooling from Vallabh Vidyanagar in Gujarat and completed his master's degree in physics and electronics from Maharaja Sayajirao University in Vadodara. After completing his master's degree in physics, he went to the United States in 1964 and obtained a master's degree in electrical engineering from the Illinois Institute of Technology in Chicago.

In 1966 he went to work for GTE in Chicago.
He is regarded as one of the earliest pioneers of hand-held computing because of his invention of the Electronic Diary in 1975.
In 1974, Pitroda joined Wescom Switching which was one of the first digital switching companies. He developed the 580 DSS switch, over nearly four years. It was released in 1978. Wescom was acquired by Rockwell International in 1980, where Pitroda became vice president. During his four decades as an engineer, Pitroda filed scores of patents in telecommunications. The latest set of patents relate to mobile phone-based transaction technology, both financial and non-financial.

He spent nearly a decade with Prime Minister Rajiv Gandhi as the leader of an effort to build an Indian information industry. The task was to extend digital telecommunications to every corner of the country, including remote villages, like the one of his birth. Pitroda launched the Center for the Development of Telematics (C-DOT) and served as Advisor to the Prime Minister on Technology Missions related to water, literacy, immunization, oil seeds, telecom, and dairy. He is also the founding chairman of India's Telecom Commission.

Pitroda returned to India a second time in 2004 to focus on building knowledge institutions and infrastructure. Pitroda served as chairman of the National Knowledge Commission (2005–2009), a high-level advisory body to the Prime Minister of India, to give policy recommendations for improving knowledge-related institutions and infrastructure in the country. During its term, the National Knowledge Commission submitted around 300 recommendations on 27 focus areas.

Pitroda also founded the National Innovation Council (2010), and served as the Advisor to the Prime Minister with rank of a cabinet minister on Public Information Infrastructure and Innovation, to help democratize information.

Pitroda founded and served as Chairman of C-SAM. The company maintains its headquarters in Chicago with offices in Singapore, Tokyo, Pune, Mumbai and Vadodara. Pitroda holds around 100 technology patents, has been involved in several start-ups and lectures extensively.

Pitroda has also started several businesses as a serial entrepreneur (Wescom Switching, Ionics, MTI, Market, WorldTel, C-SAM, etc.) in the US and Europe.

He has also served as an advisor to the United Nations and in 1992, his biography Sam Pitroda: A Biography was published and became a bestseller on The Economic Times list for five weeks.

He is living in Chicago, Illinois since 1964 with his wife and two children and also in Delhi.

Return to India 
On a 1981 trip back to India, he was frustrated by how hard it was to call his family back in Chicago, and decided he could help modernize India's telecommunications system.
In 1984, Pitroda was invited to return to India by the Prime Minister Indira Gandhi. On his return, he started the Center for Development of Telematics C-DOT, an autonomous telecom R&D organization. He had previously become a naturalized US citizen, but renounced his US citizenship to take Indian citizenship again in order to work in the Indian Government.

In 1987 during his tenure as advisor to Prime Minister Rajiv Gandhi, Pitroda headed six technology missions related to telecommunications, water, literacy, immunization, dairy, and oilseeds. 

In the 1990s Pitroda returned to Chicago to resume his business interests. In May 1995, he became the first chairman of WorldTel initiative of the International Telecommunication Union.

When the United Progressive Alliance government came to power following the 2004 General Elections, Prime Minister Manmohan Singh invited him to head the National Knowledge Commission of India.
In July 2009, the Government of India invited Pitroda to head an expert committee on ICT in Railways. In October 2009, Pitroda was appointed as advisor to PM of India Manmohan Singh on Public Information Infrastructure and Innovations with the rank of Cabinet Minister.

In August 2010, Pitroda was appointed Chairman of the National Innovation Council. He was appointed as the chancellor of the Central University of Rajasthan by the President of India in 2013.

In 2017, he was appointed as Chairman of Alpha-En Corporation, a Lithium Metal Clean Technology company.

Awards 
 Lal Bahadur Shastri National Award, 2000 in recognition of his outstanding contribution to telecommunication and harnessing it for the social and economic transformation of developing countries
 Dataquest gave Pitroda a lifetime achievement award in 2002.
 In 2008, Pitroda was elected as a world prominent leader by the World Network of Young Leaders and Entrepreneurs.
 International Telecommunication Union (ITU) conferred the World Telecommunication and Information Society Award to Pitroda in Geneva on 17 May 2011. He was awarded in recognition of his dedication to promoting Information, communication, and technology as a means of providing a better life for humanity and social and economic empowerment. He was the first Indian to receive this award.
 In May 2010, the University of Illinois at Chicago college of medicine presented him an honorary degree.
 Sambalpur University honored Pitroda with D.Sc. on its 23rd convocation on 14 July 2010.
 The Government of India awarded him the Padma Bhushan in 2009 for his contribution to Science and Engineering.
 The Skoch Challenger Lifetime Achievement Award in 2009 for ushering in the telecom and IT revolution in India.
 Andhra University honored Pitroda with D.Sc. in 2008.
 Award for Public Service in the Field of Telecommunications, IEEE Communications Society, 2007, for exceptional contributions in developing indigenous systems and telecommunications infrastructure in India
 He was felicitated on 31 March 2009 by Akhila Bharatiya Viswakarma Mahasabha (ABVM) for service to the Viswakarma community, in the presence of Chief Minister of Delhi, Smt. Sheila Dikshit.
  World Telecommunication and Information Society Award, International Telecommunication Union (ITU), 2011, for his outstanding contribution to improving life in rural communities through information and communication technologies. Sam Pitroda is the first Indian to receive this prestigious award
 He addressed the 2nd Indian Student Parliament in 2012.
 He was awarded Lifetime Achievement Award for his outstanding contributions in the field of telecom technology & innovation by American Society of Engineers of Indian Origin (ASEI) at its 31st National Convention held on 3 Dec 2016 at Cal State University, Pomona, CA 
 He addressed the gathering of students and faculties of Seshadripuram First Grade College - Yelahanka, Bangalore, and various other students and faculties from other institutions across Bangalore about the topic of 'Innovation and Advancement in Modern Education' on 14 October 2017.

Philanthropy 
Sam Pitroda currently chairs five major NGOs.

The University of Trans-Disciplinary Health Sciences and Technology 
The first is the Foundation for Revitalization of Local Health Traditions founded in 1990 with Darshan Shankar. It has now turned into The University of Trans-Disciplinary Health Sciences and Technology near Bangalore in India. The foundation promotes Ayurveda, India's traditional medicinal knowledge. Today, FRLHT has over 200 scientists and professionals on a 19-acre campus and has documented over 7,000 herbal medicinal plants. It also has over 100 herbal medicine gardens, approximately 500 acres each. Sam Pitroda is chairman, the board of trustees at the institute.

The Global Knowledge Initiative (GKI) 
In 2009, Sam Pitroda founded The Global Knowledge Initiative (GKI) along with Nina Fedoroff and Sara Farley in Washington, DC as a non-profit organization with a mission to forge, optimize, and sustain knowledge partnerships between the people and institutions of higher education and research around the world. They build and support purpose-driven networks to solve shared challenges in science, technology, and innovation.

India Food Banking Network 
In 2010, Pitroda established the India Food Banking Network (IFBN) to create a network of Food Banks in India to systematically capture and distribute food to empower and support the food security mission in India. Today, IFBN has food banks in Delhi, Gurgaon, and Noida with plans to expand into Mumbai, Bangalore, Calcutta, and others. Sam Pitroda is chairman of the advisory board of the India FoodBanking Network.

People for Global Transformation 
People for Global Transformation were launched in 2012 along with Mr. Hubert Vedrine, France's former Chief of Staff for President Mitterrand. PGT is a global think tank that brings together an interdisciplinary group of 15 leading voices from across the globe to help shape the 21st century's discourse on development and governance and provide innovative policy recommendations. The group particularly endeavors to generate greater transversal thinking on the transformational potential of technology and its consequences for all.

Action For India 
Also in 2012, Pitroda founded Action For India to help social innovators in India overcome barriers to scale and achieve greater impact at the Bottom of the Economic Pyramid.

Others 
In addition to these six NGOs, Sam Pitroda is also:
 Founding commissioner of the UN Broadband Commission
 Chairman of the m-Powering Development Initiative of the ITU in Geneva
 Chairman of the Vikram A. Sarabhai Community Science Centre
 Board Member of the World Wide Web Foundation
 Board Member of the Institute of Design, IIT, Chicago

Books

Books by Pitroda 
 IEEE Transactions on Communications, Special Publication on Telecommunication in Developing Countries, Volume COM-24, Number 7, July 1976 (Part II here)
 Exploding Freedom: Roots in Technology, Allied Publishers Limited, 1993
 Foundation for the Future: Human Resource Development, Commonwealth Secretariat, 1993
 Development of Gujarat: People’s Perceptions, Sardar Patel Institute of Economic and Social Research, Ahmedabad, 1997
 Vision, Values, & Velocity, Silicon India, 2001
 March of Mobile Money: The Future of Lifestyle Management, Harper Collins, 2010
 Dreaming Big: My Journey to Connect India, Penguin India, 2015
 Redesign the World - a Global Call to Action, published by Penguin India, 2021

Pitroda also holds a collection of over 40 years of his personal daily diaries and workbooks.

Books about Pitroda 
 Sam Pitroda: A Biography, by Mayank Chhaya, Konark Publishers Pvt Ltd, 1992
(Part II)
This biography of Sam Pitroda by Mayank Chhaya was on the bestseller list in India.

Contributions 
In 1993, Pitroda helped to establish (with Darshan Shankar) the Foundation for Revitalisation of Local Health Tradition and The University of Trans-Disciplinary Health Sciences and Technology near Bangalore in India. The foundation promotes Ayurveda, India's traditional medicinal knowledge.
The two founders were honored in 2003 by Columbia University.

References

External links 

 
 online press conference of Sam Pitroda
 Profile
 Sam Pitroda Collected news and commentary at The Times of India
 Biography of Sam Pitroda by Mayank Chaya]

1942 births
Living people
Businesspeople from Odisha
People from Balangir district
People from Vadodara
Illinois Institute of Technology alumni
Recipients of the Padma Bhushan in science & engineering
Maharaja Sayajirao University of Baroda alumni
American people of Gujarati descent
Former United States citizens
Businesspeople from Chicago
People with acquired American citizenship
Gujarati people
Recipients of Pravasi Bharatiya Samman